Carac is a tart-like Swiss dessert pastry traditionally made of ingredients such as chocolate, cream, fondant, and shortbread pie crust, usually found in the French-speaking part of Switzerland.

It consists of a pie crust filled with a light ganache of blended cream and chocolate that is covered with green colored icing or fondant.

See also

 List of pastries

References

Swiss pastries
Culinary Heritage of Switzerland
Chocolate desserts
Shortbread